GPAC Project on Advanced Content (GPAC, a recursive acronym) is an implementation of the MPEG-4 Systems standard written in ANSI C. GPAC provides tools for media playback, vector graphics and 3D rendering, MPEG-4 authoring and distribution.

GPAC provides three sets of tools based on a core library called libgpac:
 A multimedia player, cross-platform command-line based MP4Client or with a GUI Osmo4
 A multimedia packager, MP4Box
 Some server tools, around multiplexing and streaming (under development).

GPAC is cross-platform. It is written in (almost 100% ANSI) C for portability reasons, attempting to keep the memory footprint as low as possible. It is currently running under Windows, Linux, Solaris, Windows CE (SmartPhone, PocketPC 2002/2003), iOS, Android, Embedded Linux (familiar 8, GPE) and recent Symbian OS systems.

The project is intended for a wide audience ranging from end-users or content creators with development skills who want to experiment the new standards for interactive technologies or want to convert files for mobile devices, to developers who need players and/or server for multimedia streaming applications.

The GPAC framework is being developed at École nationale supérieure des télécommunications (ENST) as part of research work on digital media.

History and standards 
GPAC was founded in New York City in 1999. In 2003, it became an open-source project, with the initial goal of developing from scratch, in ANSI C, clean software compliant with the MPEG-4 Systems standard, as a small and flexible alternative to the MPEG-4 reference software.

In parallel, the project has evolved and now supports many other multimedia standards, with support for X3D, W3C SVG Tiny 1.2, and OMA/3GPP/ISMA and MPEG Dynamic Adaptive Streaming over HTTP (MPEG-DASH) features. 3D support is available on embedded platforms through OpenGL-ES. The MPEG-DASH feature can be used to reconstruct .mp4 files from videos streamed and cached in this format (e.g., YouTube). Various research projects used or use GPAC.

Since 2013, GPAC Licensing has offered business support and closed-source licenses.

Multimedia content features

Packaging 

GPAC features encoders and multiplexers, publishing and content distribution tools for MP4 files and many tools for scene descriptions (BIFS/VRML/X3D converters, SWF/BIFS, SVG/BIFS, etc....). MP4Box provides all these tools in a single command-line application, albeit with extremely arcane syntax. Current supported features are:
 MP4/3GP Conversion from MP3, AVI, MPEG-2 TS, MPEG-PS, AAC, H263, H264, AMR, and many others,
 3GPP DIMS Packaging from SVG tiny 1.2 files,
 File layout: fragmentation or interleaving, and cleaning,
 File hinting for RTP/RTSP and QTSS/DSS servers (MPEG-4/ISMA/3GP/ 3GP2 files),
 File splitting by size or time, extraction from file and file concatenation,
 XML information dumping for MP4 and RTP hint tracks,
 Media Track extractions,
 ISMA E&A encryption and decryption,
 3GPP timed text tools (SUB/SRT/TTXT/TeXML), VobSub import/export,
 BIFS codec and scene conversion between MP4, BT and XMT-A,
 LASeR codec and scene conversion between MP4, SAF, SVG and XSR (XML LASeR),
 XML scene statistics for BIFS scene (BT, XMT-A and MP4),
 Conversion to and from BT, XMT-A, WRL, X3D and X3DV with support for gzip.
 A syntax that ensures that simple operations, i.e. concatenating 3 files into one new one, are not simple.

Playing 

GPAC supports many protocols and standards, among which:
 BIFS scenes (2D, 3D and mixed 2D/3D scenes),
 VRML 2.0 (VRML97) scenes (without GEO or NURBS extensions),
 X3D scenes (not complete) in X3D (XML) and X3DV (VRML) formats,
 SVG Tiny 1.2 scenes (including packaged in 3GP DIMS files),
 LASeR and SAF (partial) support,
 Progressive loading/rendering of SVG, X3D and XMT files,
 HTTP reading of all scene descriptions,
 GZIP supported for all textual formats of MPEG4/X3D/VRML/SVG,
 MP4 and 3GPP file reading (local & http),
 MP3 and AAC files (local & http) and HTTP streaming (ShoutCast/ICEcast radios),
 Most common media codecs for image, audio and video,
 Most common media containers,
 3GPP Timed Text / MPEG-4 Streaming Text,
 MPEG-2 TS demultiplexer (local/UDP/RTP) with DVB support (Linux only),
 Streaming support through RTP/RTCP (unicast and multicast) and RTSP/SDP,
 Plugins for Mozilla (osmozilla, Win32 and Linux) and Internet Explorer (GPAX, Win32 and PPC 2003).

Streaming 

As of version 0.4.5, GPAC has some experimental server-side and streaming tools:
 MP4/3GP file RTP streamer (unicast and multicast),
 RTP streamer with service timeslicing (DVB-H) simulation,
 MPEG-2 TS broadcaster using MP4/3GP files or RTP streams as inputs,
 BIFS RTP broadcaster tool performing live encoding and RandomAccessPoints generation.

Contributors 

The project is hosted at ENST, a leading French engineering school also known as Télécom Paris. Current main contributors of GPAC are:
 Jean Le Feuvre
 Cyril Concolato
 Romain Bouqueau
 Jérôme Gorin.

Other (current or past) contributors from ENST are:
 Pierre Souchay
 Jean-Claude Moissinac
 Jean-Claude Dufourd
 Benoit Pellan
 Philippe de Cuetos.

Additionally, GPAC is used at ENST for pedagogical purposes. Students regularly participate in the development of the project.

References

External links 
GPAC homepage at Institut Mines-Télécom
GPAC project on GitHub
GPAC project on SourceForge (Deprecated 2016.01.23; See GitHub)
GPAC Licensing (business support)

MPEG
Graphics standards
Scalable Vector Graphics
Cross-platform free software
Free software programmed in C
Free video conversion software
Free 3D graphics software